Simona Necidová (born 20 January 1994) is a Czech football defender who plays for Czech First Division club Liberec on loan from Slavia Prague and the Czech Republic national team. Her elder brother Tomáš Necid is also an international footballer.

Club career
Necidová joined Slavia Prague in 2007 and broke into the first team during the 2011–12 season. In the 2015–16 UEFA Women's Champions League, she scored the winning goal in Slavia's 2–1 win over Zvezda Perm which qualified her team for the quarter-final.

International career
At the 2016 Cyprus Cup Necidová scored a late goal against Wales to secure a 1–0 win for the Czech Republic.

International goals
Statistics accurate as of match played 12 October 2022.

References

External links
 
 Profile at FC Slovan Liberec 
 Profile at SK Slavia Prague 
 Profile at Football Association of the Czech Republic 
 

1994 births
Living people
Czech women's footballers
Czech Republic women's international footballers
Women's association football defenders
Footballers from Prague
FC Slovan Liberec players
SK Slavia Praha (women) players
Czech Women's First League players